Doubravice is a municipality and village in Trutnov District in the Hradec Králové Region of the Czech Republic. It has about 400 inhabitants.

Administrative parts
Villages of Velehrádek and Zálesí are administrative parts of Doubravice.

References

Villages in Trutnov District